Latin phonology continually evolved over the centuries, making it difficult for speakers in one era to know how Latin was spoken before then. A given phoneme may be represented by different letters in different periods. This article deals primarily with modern scholarship's best reconstruction of Classical Latin's phonemes (phonology) and the pronunciation and spelling used by educated people in the late Roman Republic. This article then touches upon later changes and other variants. Knowledge of how Latin was pronounced comes from Roman grammar books, common misspellings by Romans, transcriptions into other ancient languages, and from how pronunciation has evolved in derived Romance languages.

Latin orthography is the spelling of Latin words written in the scripts of all historical phases of Latin from Old Latin to the present. All scripts use the Latin alphabet, but conventional spellings may vary from phase to phase. The Latin alphabet was adapted from the Old Italic script to represent the phonemes of the Latin language. The Old Italic script had in turn been borrowed from the Greek alphabet, itself adapted from the Phoenician alphabet. The Latin alphabet most resembles the Greek alphabet around 540 BC, as it appears on the black-figure pottery of the time.

Letterforms

The forms of the Latin alphabet used during the Classical period did not distinguish between upper case and lower case. Roman inscriptions typically use Roman square capitals, which resemble modern capitals, and handwritten text often uses old Roman cursive, which includes letterforms similar to modern lowercase.

Letters and phonemes
In ancient Latin spelling, individual letters mostly corresponded to individual phonemes, with three main exceptions:
 The vowel letters a, e, i, o, u, y represented both short and long vowels. The long vowels were often marked by apices during the Classical period ⟨Á É Ó V́ Ý⟩, and long i was written using a taller version ⟨I⟩, called i longa "long I": ⟨ꟾ⟩; but now long vowels are sometimes written with a macron in modern editions (ā), while short vowels are marked with a breve (ă) in dictionaries when necessary.
 Some pairs of vowel letters, such as ae, represented either a diphthong in one syllable or two vowels in adjacent syllables.

In the tables below, Latin letters and digraphs are paired with the phonemes that they usually represent in the International Phonetic Alphabet.

Consonants
This is a table of the consonant phonemes of Classical Latin. Those in parentheses have a debatable status as phonemes, and those marked with an asterisk are only found in Greek loanwords in educated pronunciation, except for some instances of /kʰ/. See below for further details.

Notes on phonetics
 before  may have become  by dissimilation. These spellings may, however, simply indicate that c g before u were labialized like , so that writing a double uu was redundant.
 The voiceless plosives  in Latin were likely less aspirated than voiceless plosives at the beginning of words in English; for example, Latin  was not as strongly aspirated as k in kind but more like k in English sky or look. Some Greek words beginning with the voiceless plosives , when they were borrowed into colloquial Latin, were spelled with the graphemes used to represent voiced plosives b d g , e.g., Latin  besides West Greek   (cybernatas) (helmsman). That suggests that Latin speakers felt the Greek voiceless plosives to sound less aspirated than their own native equivalents.
 The aspirated consonants  as distinctive phonemes were originally foreign to Latin, appearing in educated loanwords and names from Greek. In such cases, the aspiration was likely produced only by educated speakers.
  was also not native to Classical Latin. In Classical Latin poetry, the letter  between vowels always counts as two consonants for metrical purposes.
 In Classical Latin, the coronal sibilant  was likely unvoiced in all positions.
Often in the poetry of Plautus, Ennius, and Lucretius, final  before a word beginning in a consonant did not make the preceding syllable heavy. By the Classical period this was felt to be somewhat of a marker of non-urban speech by Cicero.
 In most cases  was pronounced as a bilabial nasal. In Old Latin inscriptions, final m is often omitted, as in uiro for uirom (Classical ).
  assimilated to a velar nasal  before .
 In Classical Latin, the rhotic  was most likely an alveolar trill . Gaius Lucilius likens it to the sound of a dog, and later writers describe it as being produced by vibration.
  was strongly velarized in syllable coda and probably somewhat palatalized when geminated or followed by /i(ː)/. In intervocalic position, it appears to have been velarized before all vowels except /i(ː)/.
  was pronounced as an approximant until the first century AD, when  and  began to develop into fricatives.

Notes on spelling
 Doubled consonant letters, such as cc, ss, represented geminated (doubled or long) consonants: . In Old Latin, geminate consonants were written singly like single consonants, until the middle of the 2nd century BC, when they began to be doubled in writing. Grammarians mention the marking of double consonants with the sicilicus, a diacritic in the shape of a sickle. This mark appears in a few inscriptions of the Augustan era.
 c and k both represent the velar stop ; qu represents the labialized velar stop .
 x represented the consonant cluster . In Old Latin, this sequence was also spelled as ks, cs, and xs. In the standard Ionic alphabet, used for modern editions of Ancient Greek, on the other hand, Χ represented , and the letter xi (Ξ) represented .
They were both represented by c before e and i, q before o and u, and k before consonants and a. The letterform of c derives from Greek gamma Γ, which represented , but its use for  may come from Etruscan, which did not distinguish voiced and voiceless plosives.
The letter g was created in the third century BC to distinguish the voiced  from voiceless . Its letterform derived from c by the addition of a diacritic or stroke. Plutarch attributes this innovation to Spurius Carvilius Ruga around 230 BC, but it may have originated with Appius Claudius Caecus in the fourth century BC.
Vowels before this cluster were sometimes long and sometimes short.
Aspirated plosives and the glottal fricative  were also used hypercorrectively, an affectation satirized in Catullus 84.
It indicates not that the vowel is long but that the first syllable is heavy from the double consonant.
 u (v) between vowels represented single  in native Latin words but double  in Greek loanwords.

Vowels

Monophthongs
Latin has ten native vowels, spelled a, e, i, o, u.

The long versions of the close and mid vowels e, i, o, u had probably a different vowel quality from the short versions, so that long  were similar to short  (see following section).

Long and short vowels 

This opening made the short vowels i, u  similar in quality to long ē ō  respectively. i, ē and u, ō were often written in place of each other in inscriptions:
  for  
  for  
  for  
  for  

Short  most likely had a more open allophone before  and tended toward near-open .

Adoption of Greek upsilon
y was used in Greek loanwords with upsilon Υ. This letter represented the close front rounded vowel, both short and long: .

An intermediate vowel sound (likely a close central vowel  or possibly its rounded counterpart ), called , can be reconstructed for the classical period. It developed out of a historical short , later fronted by vowel reduction. In the vicinity of labial consonants, this sound was not as fronted and may have retained some rounding, thus being more similar if not identical to the unreduced short  . It was sometimes spelled by the Claudian letter Ⱶ ⱶ.

Vowel nasalization

Vowels followed by a nasal consonant were allophonically realised as long nasal vowels in two environments:
 Before word-final m:
   > 
   > 
 Before nasal consonants followed by a fricative:
   >  (in early inscriptions, often written as )
   >  (written as )
Those long nasal vowels had the same quality as ordinary long vowels. In Vulgar Latin, the vowels lost their nasalisation, and they merged with the long vowels (which were themselves shortened by that time). This is shown by many forms in the Romance languages, such as Spanish  from Vulgar Latin  (originally ) and Italian  from Vulgar Latin  (Classical Latin ).

When a final -m occurred before a plosive or nasal in the next word, however, it was pronounced as a nasal at the place of articulation of the following consonant.

Diphthongs

The diphthong ei mostly had changed to ī by the classical epoch; ei remained only in a few words such as the interjection .

If there is a tréma above the second vowel, both vowels are pronounced separately: aë , aü , eü  and oë . However, disyllabic eu in morpheme borders is traditionally written without the tréma:   'my'.

The process, however, does not seem to have been completed before the 3rd century AD, and some scholars say that it may have been regular by the 5th century.

Vowel and consonant length
Vowel and consonant length were more significant and more clearly defined in Latin than in modern English. Length is the duration of time that a particular sound is held before proceeding to the next sound in a word. In the modern spelling of Latin, especially in dictionaries and academic work, macrons are frequently used to mark long vowels: , while the breve is sometimes used to indicate that a vowel is short: .

Long consonants were usually indicated through doubling, but ancient Latin orthography did not distinguish between the vocalic and consonantal uses of i and v. Vowel length was indicated only intermittently in classical sources and even then through a variety of means. Later medieval and modern usage tended to omit vowel length altogether. A short-lived convention of spelling long vowels by doubling the vowel letter is associated with the poet Lucius Accius. Later spelling conventions marked long vowels with an apex (a diacritic similar to an acute accent) or, in the case of long i, by increasing the height of the letter (long i); in the second century AD, those were given apices as well. The Classical vowel length system faded in later Latin and ceased to be phonemic in Romance, having been replaced by contrasts in vowel quality. Consonant length, however, remains contrastive in much of Italo-Romance, cf. Italian  "ninth" versus  "grandfather".

Table of orthography

The exceptions are mentioned below:

Syllables and stress

Old Latin stress
In Old Latin, as in Proto-Italic, stress normally fell on the first syllable of a word. During this period, the word-initial stress triggered changes in the vowels of non-initial syllables, the effects of which are still visible in classical Latin. Compare for example:
In the earliest Latin writings, the original unreduced vowels are still visible. Study of this vowel reduction, as well as syncopation (dropping of short unaccented syllables) in Greek loan words, indicates that the stress remained word-initial until around the time of Plautus, in the 3rd century BC. The placement of the stress then shifted to become the pattern found in classical Latin.

Classical Latin syllables and stress

In Classical Latin, stress changed. It moved from the first syllable to one of the last three syllables, called the antepenult, the penult, and the ultima (short for  'before almost last',  'almost last', and  'last syllable'). Its position is determined by the syllable weight of the penult. If the penult is heavy, it is accented; if the penult is light and there are more than two syllables, the antepenult is accented. In a few words originally accented on the penult, accent is on the ultima because the two last syllables have been contracted, or the last syllable has been lost.

Syllable
To determine stress, syllable weight of the penult must be determined. To determine syllable weight, words must be broken up into syllables. In the following examples, syllable structure is represented using these symbols: C (a consonant), K (a stop), R (a liquid), and V (a short vowel), VV (a long vowel or diphthong).

Nucleus
Every short vowel, long vowel, or diphthong belongs to a single syllable. This vowel forms the syllable nucleus. Thus  has four syllables, one for every vowel (a i ā u: V V VV V),  has three (ae e u: VV V V),  has two (u ō: V VV), and  has one (ui: VV).

Onset and coda
A consonant before a vowel or a consonant cluster at the beginning of a word is placed in the same syllable as the following vowel. This consonant or consonant cluster forms the syllable onset.
  (CVV.CV.CVV)
  (CV.CVV.CV)
  (CV.V.CVV)
  (CV.VV.CVV)
  (CCV.CV.CVC)
  (CCCVV.CVC)

After this, if there is an additional consonant inside the word, it is placed at the end of the syllable. This consonant is the syllable coda. Thus if a consonant cluster of two consonants occurs between vowels, they are broken up between syllables: one goes with the syllable before, the other with the syllable after.
  (CV.VC.CV)
  (CV.CVC.CVC)
  (CV.VVC.CVC)
  (VC.CVC.CVVC.CVC)

There are two exceptions. A consonant cluster of a stop p t c b d g followed by a liquid l r between vowels usually goes to the syllable after it, although it is also sometimes broken up like other consonant clusters.

Heavy and light syllables
As shown in the examples above, Latin syllables have a variety of possible structures. Here are some of them. The first four examples are light syllables, and the last six are heavy. All syllables have at least one V (vowel). A syllable is heavy if it has another V or C (or both) after the first V. In the table below, the extra V or VC is bolded, indicating that it makes the syllable heavy.

Thus, a syllable is heavy if it ends in a long vowel or diphthong, a short vowel and a consonant, a long vowel and a consonant, or a diphthong and a consonant. Syllables ending in a diphthong and consonant are rare in Classical Latin.

The syllable onset has no relationship to syllable weight; both heavy and light syllables can have no onset or an onset of one, two, or three consonants.

In Latin a syllable that is heavy because it ends in a long vowel or diphthong is traditionally called  ('syllable long by nature'), and a syllable that is heavy because it ends in a consonant is called  ('long by position'). This article uses the words heavy and light for syllables, and long and short for vowels since the two are not the same.

Stress rule
In a word of three or more syllables, the weight of the penult determines where the accent is placed. If the penult is light, accent is placed on the antepenult; if it is heavy, accent is placed on the penult. Below, stress is marked by placing the stress mark  before the stressed syllable.

Iambic shortening

The term also refers to shortening of closed syllables following a short syllable, for example  and so on. This type of shortening is found in early Latin, for example in the comedies of Plautus and Terence, but not in poetry of the classical period.

Elision
Elision also occurred in Ancient Greek, but in that language, it is shown in writing by the vowel in question being replaced by an apostrophe, whereas in Latin elision is not indicated at all in the orthography, but can be deduced from the verse form.

Modern conventions

Spelling

Letters

An alternative approach, less common today, is to use i and u only for the vowels and j and v for the approximants.

Most modern editions, however, adopt an intermediate position, distinguishing between u and v but not between i and j.

Diacritics
Textbooks and dictionaries usually indicate the length of vowels by putting a macron or horizontal bar above the long vowel, but it is not generally done in regular texts.

Sometimes, for instance in Roman Catholic service books, an acute accent over a vowel is used to indicate the stressed syllable. It would be  redundant for one who knew the classical rules of accentuation and made the correct distinction between long and short vowels, but most Latin speakers since the 3rd century have not made any distinction between long and short vowels, but they have kept the accents in the same places; thus, the use of accent marks allows speakers to read a word aloud correctly even if they have never heard it spoken aloud.

Pronunciation

Post-Medieval Latin

Since around the beginning of the Renaissance period onwards, with the language being used as an international language among intellectuals, pronunciation of Latin in Europe came to be dominated by the phonology of local languages, resulting in a variety of different pronunciation systems. See the article Latin regional pronunciation for more details on those (with the exception of the Italian one, which is described in the section on Ecclesiastical pronunciation below).

Loan words and formal study

When Latin words are used as loanwords in a modern language, there is ordinarily little or no attempt to pronounce them as the Romans did; in most cases, a pronunciation suiting the phonology of the receiving language is employed.

Latin words in common use in English are generally fully assimilated into the English sound system, with little to mark them as foreign, for example, cranium, saliva.  Other words have a stronger Latin feel to them, usually because of spelling features such as the digraphs ae and oe (occasionally written as ligatures: æ and œ, respectively), which both denote  in English.  The digraph ae or ligature æ in some words tend to be given an  pronunciation, for example, curriculum vitae.

However, using loan words in the context of the language borrowing them is a markedly different situation from the study of Latin itself. In this classroom setting, instructors and students attempt to recreate at least some sense of the original pronunciation. What is taught to native anglophones is suggested by the sounds of today's Romance languages, the direct descendants of Latin. Instructors who take this approach rationalize that Romance vowels probably come closer to the original pronunciation than those of any other modern language (see also the section below on "Derivative languages").

However, other languages—including Romance family members—all have their own interpretations of the Latin phonological system, applied both to loan words and formal study of Latin. But English, Romance, or other teachers do not always point out that the particular accent their students learn is not actually the way ancient Romans spoke.

Ecclesiastical pronunciation

Because of the central position of Rome within the Catholic Church, an Italian pronunciation of Latin became commonly accepted, but this was not the case until the latter part of the 19th century. This pronunciation corresponds to that of the Latin-derived words in Italian. Before then, the pronunciation of Latin in church was the same as the pronunciation as Latin in other fields and tended to reflect the sound values associated with the nationality of the speaker. Other ecclesiastical variations are still in use (e.g. Germanic pronunciations), especially outside the Catholic Church.

The following are the main points that distinguish modern Italianate ecclesiastical pronunciation from Classical Latin pronunciation:

The exceptions are mentioned below:

 Vowel length is not phonemic. As a result, the automatic stress accent of Classical Latin, which was dependent on vowel length, becomes a phonemic one in Ecclesiastical Latin. (Some Ecclesiastical texts mark the stress with an acute accent in words of three or more syllables.)
 Word-final m and n are pronounced fully, with no nasalization of the preceding vowel.

In his Vox Latina: A guide to the Pronunciation of Classical Latin, William Sidney Allen remarked that this pronunciation, used by the Catholic Church in Rome and elsewhere, and whose adoption Pope Pius X recommended in a 1912 letter to the Archbishop of Bourges, "is probably less far removed from classical Latin than any other 'national' pronunciation"; but, as can be seen from the table above, there are, nevertheless, very significant differences. The introduction to the Liber Usualis indicates that Ecclesiastical Latin pronunciation should be used at Church liturgies. The Pontifical Academy for Latin is the pontifical academy in the Vatican that is charged with the dissemination and education of Catholics in the Latin language.

Outside of Austria, Germany, Czechia and Slovakia, it is the most widely used standard in choral singing which, with a few exceptions like Stravinsky's , is concerned with liturgical texts. Anglican choirs adopted it when classicists abandoned traditional English pronunciation after World War II. The rise of historically informed performance and the availability of guides such as Copeman's Singing in Latin has led to the recent revival of regional pronunciations.

Pronunciation shared by Vulgar Latin and Romance languages

Because it gave rise to many modern languages, Latin did not "die"; it merely evolved over the centuries in different regions in diverse ways. The local dialects of Vulgar Latin that emerged eventually became modern Italian, Spanish, French, Romanian, Portuguese, Catalan, Romansh, Dalmatian, Sardinian, and many others.

Key features of Vulgar Latin and Romance languages include:

 Conversion of the distinction of vowel length into a distinction of height, and subsequent merger of some of these phonemes. Most Romance languages merged short  with long  and short  with long .
 Monophthongization of  into  and  into .
 Loss of  before  (CL  > VL ) but this influence on the later development of Romance languages was limited from written influence, analogy, and learned borrowings.
 Palatalization of  followed by a vowel (if not preceded by s, t, x) into .
 Fortition of syllable-initial  into , developing further into  in many Romance varieties, or sometimes alternatively into  in some contexts.

Examples

The following examples are both in verse, which demonstrates several features more clearly than prose.

From Classical Latin
Virgil's , Book 1, verses 1–4. Quantitative metre (dactylic hexameter). Translation: "I sing of arms and the man, who, driven by fate, came first from the borders of Troy to Italy and the Lavinian shores; he [was] much afflicted both on lands and on the deep by the power of the gods, because of fierce Juno's vindictive wrath."

  Ancient Roman orthography (before 2nd century)<div style='font-variant-caps:all-small-caps'>
ARMA·VIRVMQVE·CANÓ·TRÓIAE·QVꟾ·PRꟾMVS·ABÓRꟾS
ꟾTALIAM·FÁTÓ·PROFVGVS·LÁVꟾNIAQVE·VÉNIT
LꟾTORA·MVLTVM·ILLE·ETTERRꟾS·IACTÁTVS·ETALTÓ
Vꟾ·SVPERVM·SAEVAE·MEMOREM·IV́NÓNIS·OBꟾRAM
 Traditional (19th century) English orthography
Arma virúmque cano, Trojæ qui primus ab oris
Italiam, fato profugus, Lavíniaque venit
Litora; multùm ille et terris jactatus et alto
Vi superum, sævæ memorem Junonis ob iram.
 Modern orthography with macrons
Arma virumque canō, Trōiae quī prīmus ab ōrīs
Ītaliam, fātō profugus, Lāvīniaque vēnit
Lītora; multum ille et terrīs iactātus et altō
Vī superum, saevae memorem Iūnōnis ob īram.
 Modern orthography without macrons
Arma virumque cano, Troiae qui primus ab oris
Italiam, fato profugus, Laviniaque venit
Litora; multum ille et terris iactatus et alto
Vi superum, saevae memorem Iunonis ob iram.
 [Reconstructed] Classical Roman pronunciation
[ˈar.ma wɪ|ˈrũː.kᶣɛ ˈka|noː ˈtroː|jae̯ kᶣiː |ˈpriː.mʊs‿a‖ˈb‿oː.riːs
iː.ˈta.li|ãː ˈfaː|toː ˈprɔ.fʊ|ɡʊs laː|ˈwiː.nja.kᶣɛ ‖ˈweː.nɪt
ˈliː.tɔ.ra | ˈmʊɫ.t(ᶣ)‿ɪl|l‿ɛt ˈtɛr|riːs jak|ˈtaː.tʊ.s‿ɛ‖ˈt.aɫ.toː
wiː ˈsʊ.pæ|rũː ˈsae̯|wae̯ ˈmɛ.mɔ|rẽː juː|ˈnoː.nɪ.s‿ɔ‖ˈb‿iː.rãː]

For a fuller discussion of the prosodic features of this passage, see Dactylic hexameter.

Some manuscripts have "" rather than "" in the second line.

From Medieval Latin
Rhymed accentual metre. Translation: "Extol, [my] tongue, the mystery of the glorious body and the precious blood, which the fruit of a noble womb, the king of nations, poured out as the price of the world."

 Traditional orthography as in Roman Catholic service books (stressed syllable marked with an acute accent on words of three syllables or more).
 Pange lingua gloriósi
 Córporis mystérium,
 Sanguinísque pretiósi,
 quem in mundi prétium
 fructus ventris generósi
 Rex effúdit géntium.
 "Italianate" ecclesiastical pronunciation

See also
Latin alphabet
Latin grammar
Latin regional pronunciation
Traditional English pronunciation of Latin
Deutsche Aussprache des Lateinischen  – traditional German pronunciation
Schulaussprache des Lateinischen  – revised "school" pronunciation
Traditional French pronunciation

Notes

References

Bibliography

Further reading
Hall, William Dawson, and Michael De Angelis. 1971. Latin Pronunciation According to Roman Usage. Anaheim, CA: National Music Publishers.
Trame, Richard H. 1983. "A Note On Latin Pronunciation." The Choral Journal 23, no. 5: 29. https://www.jstor.org/stable/23546146.Copy

External links

 : Classical and ecclesiastical Latin pronunciation with audio examples
 
 
 glottothèque - Ancient Indo-European Grammars online, an online collection of video lectures on Ancient Indo-European languages, including lectures about the phonology and writing systems of Early Latin

Latin language
Italic phonologies
Indo-European Latin-script orthographies